Zerkoh Valley (alternately Zirko, Zer-e-koh) runs for 30 miles through Shindand District, Herat Province, Afghanistan.

Civilian deaths in Coalition airstrikes
On 29 April 2007, a number of Afghan civilians in Zerkoh were killed in airstrikes conducted in support of US Special Operations Forces.  Estimates of the number of dead vary, with the Afghan government claiming 42 killed, with no sign of Taliban forces.  Initial Coalition media reports stated that 87 Taliban were killed with no reports of civilian casualties.  Human Rights Watch reported the civilian dead as at least 25.

External links
Special Forces Travel a Difficult Road in Afghanistan.  All Things Considered, National Public Radio.  June 10, 2009

References

Landforms of Herat Province
Valleys of Afghanistan